George V "Gochia" (Giorgi V Gočia) was King of Imereti (western Georgia) from 1696 to 1698. He is frequently referred to as George IV when Giorgi III Gurieli, who had reigned as George IV of Imereti from 1681 to 1683, is omitted from the list of the kings of Imereti.

He was a relative of the reigning Bagrationi Dynasty and resided in Mingrelia until recalled by the party of Imeretian nobles and installed as king after the deposition of King Archil in 1696. The powerful leader of this party, Prince Giorgi-Malakia Abashidze, gave his daughter Tamar, widow of Alexander IV of Imereti, in marriage to George V, and became a virtual ruler of the kingdom. Despised for his incompetence and ignobility, George was soon deposed by Abashidze aided by Shoshita, Duke of Racha, who restored Archil to the Imeretian throne.

References

 Вахушти Багратиони (Vakhushti Bagrationi) (1745). История Царства Грузинского: Жизнь Имерети.
David Marshall Lang, The Last Years of the Georgian Monarchy, 1658-1832. New York: Columbia University Press, 1957.

Kings of Imereti
17th-century people from Georgia (country)
Eastern Orthodox monarchs